Abonyi is a surname. Notable people with the surname include:

Attila Abonyi (born 1946), Hungarian-born Australian footballer and manager
István Abonyi (1886–1942), Hungarian chess master

See also
 Abony

Hungarian-language surnames